Potts Grove is an unincorporated community in Northumberland County, Pennsylvania, United States. Potts Grove has a post office, with ZIP code 17865, which opened on January 18, 1830.

References

Unincorporated communities in Northumberland County, Pennsylvania
Unincorporated communities in Pennsylvania